3rd Street station or Third Street station may refer to:

Third Street station (Miami), a Miami Metromover station
Third Street/Convention Center station, a LYNX rapid transit station in Charlotte
Mill Avenue/Third Street station, a METRO Light Rail station in Tempe, Arizona
3rd Street/Jefferson and 3rd Street/Washington stations in Phoenix
3 Street Southwest station, a C-Train station in Calgary
3rd Street station (DC Streetcar), a streetcar stop in Washington, D.C.
Third Street station (BMT Fifth Avenue Line), a demolished station on the BMT Fifth Avenue Line
the Western Pacific Depot, a disused station in Oakland, California

See also
3rd Street (disambiguation)
Third Street Light Rail Project